Ioana Bulcă (born 7 January 1933) is a Romanian film actress. She appeared in 20 films between 1955 and 2007.

Selected filmography
 The Mill of Good Luck (1955) - Ana
 A Woman for a Season (1969)
 Mihai Viteazul (1971)
 Then I Sentenced Them All to Death (1972)
 Vocea inimii (2006) - Lucreția
 Inimă de țigan (2007) - Afrodita
 Regina (2008) - Ludmila
 Moștenirea (2010) - Rodia's mother
 O nouă viață (2014) - Vivi's grandmother

References

External links

1933 births
Living people
Romanian film actresses
People from Craiova
20th-century Romanian actresses
21st-century Romanian actresses